MAX is an album by American jazz drummer Max Roach featuring tracks recorded in 1958 and released on the Argo label.

Reception

The Allmusic review states, "1958's MAX shows Max Roach at the top of his game. A decade earlier, Roach had absorbed Kenny Clarke's drumming style and, with trumpet virtuoso Clifford Brown, forged his own brand of bebop. By 1958, on his way to becoming a true jazz elder, Roach began pushing the boundaries of jazz even further".

Track listing
All compositions by Max Roach except as indicated
 "Crackle Hut" (Owen Marshall) - 5:47     
 "Speculate" (Kenny Dorham) - 4:59     
 "That Ole Devil Love" (Doris Fisher, Allan Roberts) - 6:26     
 "Audio Blues" - 6:29     
 "C.M." (Hank Mobley) - 5:01     
 "Four-X" - 3:57

Personnel 
Max Roach - drums
Kenny Dorham - trumpet
Hank Mobley  - tenor saxophone
Ramsey Lewis - piano
George Morrow - bass

References 

1958 albums
Max Roach albums
Argo Records albums